Charadrahyla juanitae is a species of frog in the family Hylidae.
It is endemic to Mexico.
Its natural habitats are subtropical or tropical moist lowland forests, subtropical or tropical moist montane forests, and intermittent rivers.
It is threatened by habitat loss.

References

juanitae
Amphibians described in 1972
Taxonomy articles created by Polbot